Allison Smith (born December 9, 1969) is an American actress, singer, writer and director, best known for her work on television as Mallory O'Brien in Aaron Sorkin's Emmy Award-winning NBC drama The West Wing and for starring on Broadway in the title role Annie. She also played the role of Jennie Lowell on the 1980s Emmy Award-winning sitcom Kate & Allie. In addition to starring in Annie, Smith has also appeared on stage in a host of other roles, including a part in the original Broadway production of Evita (alongside Patti LuPone and Mandy Patinkin), a starring role in the Los Angeles premiere production of David Mamet's Oleanna, and supporting roles in Peter Parnell's QED (opposite Alan Alda), and the musical The Education Of Randy Newman, in which she played Randy Newman's first wife.

Selected filmography

TV works

Selected television roles

Film roles

References

External links

1969 births
Actresses from New Jersey
Actresses from New York City
American child actresses
American film actresses
American musical theatre actresses
American television actresses
Living people
People from Manhattan
People from Waldwick, New Jersey
Singers from New Jersey
Singers from New York City
21st-century American actresses
20th-century American actresses
21st-century American singers
20th-century American singers
20th-century American women singers
21st-century American women singers